Yaar-e-Bewafa is  a Pakistani romantic drama serial that aired on Geo Entertainment and is written by Mohsin Ali. It is produced by Wajahat Rauf and Shazia Wajahat under Showcase Productions and directed by Zeeshan Ahmed. It stars Imran Abbas, Sarah Khan and Arij Fatyma in lead roles, and premiered on 6 July 2017 on Thursdays at 8:00 P.M on Geo TV.

Synopsis 
Every human heart is running behind to catch its wishes and achieve betterment in life. Drama serial "Yaar-e-Bewafa" is also focusing on the issue that how selfish a person can behave, when they get a little hope for the better future, even they forget their present belongings and relationships. This play revolves around two different families which will connect each other with the progression of events.

Zaid is living with his mother, wife and a son. His mother raises him with much suffering and many difficulties after the death of his father. She made sure about his quality studies despite their financial problems. Zaid met his wife (Fiza) in university and they fall in love with each other. Fiza belongs to a rich family while Zaid is just a white collar guy. Fiza's parent opposes her below standard choice and discontinues their connection with her after wedding.

Another dimension of the play is Saleem's family, who live with his wife (Amna) and a son. He is kind of short-tempered, truculent and works in a chemical factory. Once he gets ill and after a complete diagnosis, shocking news reveals that he is suffering from lungs cancer. Now Amna faces financial crises due to Saleem's illness.

The fate brings another woman in Zaid's life after the departure of Fiza. They both develop strong bonding, affection and soft corner for each other. Fiza who is busy in collecting materialistic happiness for her, seems like she is losing them forever.

Is it a sensible act to value our future happiness while ignoring present happiness?

Cast
Imran Abbas as Zayd Ahmed 
Arij Fatyma as Fizza Zayd
Sarah Khan as Amna Salim (first marriage with Salim); Amna Zayd (second marriage with Zayd)
Saleem Mairaj as Salim Munawwar 
Samina Ahmed as Humaira
Ray Khan As Neelam
Saad Fareedi as Zain   
Tahir Jatao as Mr. Kamal  
Birjees Farooqui as Mrs. Kamal
Mehboob Sultan as Mr. Rashid
Haneef Bachan as Boss
Munnazah Motiwala as Sarah
Farah Zeba as Khala    
Surooj Afaq as Jameela
Syed Sajid Ali as Khaloo
Faisal Bali as Saleem’s Friend 
Sharjeel Khan as Mechanic 
Dr. Kashif Malik as Humaira’s Doctor
Ikhyar Khan as Dr. Asadullah Hussaini 
Fida Daar as Zaid’s Wakeel
Bawa Jee as Saith Sahab
Falak Shahzad (Child Star) as Umar Ahmed
Aaliyan Wasiq (Child Star) as Ahmed Husayn

Soundtrack 
The original soundtrack of Yaar-e-Bewafa is composed and sung by Imran Abbas, the lead actor of the drama serial. The lyrics are penned down by Ahmed Faraz. The song is available on Patari. Also Real The Official Song Lyric Online Only On KaalDev Lyrics.

References

Pakistani romantic drama television series
Urdu-language television shows
2017 Pakistani television series debuts
2017 Pakistani television series endings